Line 3 of Qingdao Metro is an underground metro line in Qingdao. The north section began operation on December 16, 2015, and the south section began operation on December 18, 2016.

Opening timeline

Stations

References

Qingdao Metro lines
2015 establishments in China
Railway lines opened in 2015